Shirkol is a village in Dharwad district of Karnataka, India.

Demographics 
As of the 2011 Census of India there were 736 households in Shirkol and a total population of 3,668 consisting of 1,910 males and 1,758 females. There were 411 children ages 0-6.

References

Villages in Dharwad district